Spilarctia cinnamomea is a moth in the family Erebidae. It was described by Rob de Vos and Daawia Suhartawan in 2011. It is found in New Guinea.

References

Moths described in 2011
cinnamomea